Wenzhou World Trade Center is a 68-floor supertall skyscraper in Wenzhou, Zhejiang, China. Construction of the building began on 9 June 2003 and was completed in 2010 at 333 m (1,093 ft), giving it the title of the 107th-tallest building in the world. It is located in the downtown area of Wenzhou where it stands as the tallest building in the city, the tallest in Zhejiang province and the 56th-tallest in China.

The Wenzhou World Trade Center is to be used as office space and a luxury hotel.

Original plans called for the Wenzhou World Trade Center to be only 260 m (853 ft) tall.

References

External links
 Wenzhou Trade Center on CTBUH Skyscraper Center

Office buildings completed in 2010
Residential buildings completed in 2010
World Trade Centers
2010 establishments in China